Group 6 of the UEFA Euro 1968 qualifying tournament was one of the eight groups to decide which teams would qualify for the UEFA Euro 1968 finals tournament. Group 6 consisted of four teams: Italy, Romania, Switzerland, and Cyprus, where they played against each other home-and-away in a round-robin format. The group winners were Italy, who finished 5 points above Romania.

Final table

Matches

Goalscorers

References
 
 
 

Group 1
1966–67 in Italian football
1967–68 in Italian football
1966–67 in Romanian football
1967–68 in Romanian football
1966–67 in Swiss football
1967–68 in Swiss football
1966–67 in Cypriot football
1967–68 in Cypriot football
Italy at UEFA Euro 1968